Heiko Szonn (born 23 June 1976) is a German cyclist. He competed in two events at the 1996 Summer Olympics.

References

External links
 

1976 births
Living people
German male cyclists
Olympic cyclists of Germany
Cyclists at the 1996 Summer Olympics
Cyclists from Brandenburg
People from Forst (Lausitz)
People from Bezirk Cottbus
20th-century German people